Matthew Alford is a British author best known for The Writer with No Hands.

Career
Alford was awarded a doctorate in Film Studies by the University of Bath in 2008.  

He subsequently wrote articles for The Guardian, New Statesman, and Independent, as well as Fortean Times.

Alford's novel The Writer with No Hands, which followed his investigation into the disappearance of screenwriter Gary Devore, was reworked as documentary, stage play, and the title used as a social media platform.

The documentary Theaters of War (2022) is partially based on his co-authored book National Security Cinema.

Books
Reel Power: Hollywood Cinema and American Supremacy. London: Pluto Press, 2010. .
2013. Chinese edition (simplified script). Hollywood Power Culture. Translation by Yang Xianjun and published by Economic Science Press. 
2018. French edition with new introduction by the author. Hollywood Propaganda, Cinéma Hollywoodien et Hégémonie Américaine. Translation by Cyrille Rivallan and published by Éditions Critiques.
National Security Cinema: The Shocking New Evidence of Government Control in Hollywood (CreateSpace, 2017). With Tom Secker.
2021. Expanded French edition. L'Empire Vous Divertit: Comment la CIA et le Pentagone Utilisent Hollywood. Translation by Philippe Stroot and published by Investig'Action.
Union Jackboot: What Your Media and Professors Don't Tell You About British Foreign Policy (CreateSpace, 2018). With T.J Coles.

References

External links
 Author page
 IMDb Profile

British male non-fiction writers
British investigative journalists
Year of birth missing (living people)
Living people
21st-century British male writers
British foreign policy writers
British film historians